Jarvis W. Pike (1795–September 12, 1854)  was the first mayor of Columbus, Ohio.

Pike died September 12, 1854. He was buried in a private or family graveyard.   He was later reinterred at Union Grove Cemetery located at Canal Winchester, Ohio.

References

Bibliography

Further reading

External links
Jarvis W. Pike at Political Graveyard

1795 births
1854 deaths
Mayors of Columbus, Ohio
19th-century American politicians